Christina "Tina" Weirather (born 24 May 1989) is a retired Liechtensteiner World Cup alpine ski racer. She won a bronze medal in Super-G for Liechtenstein at the 2018 Winter Olympics in Pyeongchang.

Racing career
Weirather made her World Cup debut at age 16 in October 2005 and had nine victories and 41 podiums through her retirement in 2020, during the COVID-19 pandemic.

Weirather competed in two events at the 2006 Winter Olympics in Turin, Italy, and finished 33rd in the super-G, but did not finish in the downhill. She had qualified to ski in four events at the 2010 Winter Olympics: downhill, super-G, giant slalom, and the combined. Just weeks before the Olympics on 23 January, while competing in a World Cup downhill at Cortina d'Ampezzo, Weirather suffered another anterior cruciate ligament injury to her right knee and missed the Olympics, as well as the following World Cup season of 2011.

Following years of training alongside her compatriots on the Liechtenstein Alpine Ski team, Weirather switched to training with the Swiss team.

During the fourth training run for the downhill at the 2014 Winter Olympics, Weirather crashed at Rosa Khutor on 9 February and injured her lower right leg. The bone contusion caused her to miss her starts in the Olympics and the remainder of the 2014 World Cup season. At the time, she was second in the World Cup overall, downhill and super-G standings and third in the giant slalom.

On 25 March 2020 she announced her retirement.

Personal life
Born in Vaduz, Weirather is the daughter of former World Cup ski racers Harti Weirather of Austria and Hanni Wenzel of Liechtenstein (and the niece of Andreas Wenzel). Her mother Hanni won two overall World Cup titles (1978, 1980) and two Olympic gold medals (1980), four Olympic medals overall; uncle Andreas won the men's overall World Cup title in 1980 and 2 Olympic medals. Her father Harti won the season title in downhill in 1981 and was world champion in 1982.

Weirather currently resides in Gamprin and has dual citizenship in Liechtenstein and Austria.

She is a keen fan of Liechtenstein football club Vaduz.

World Cup results

Season titles

Season standings

Race podiums
 9 wins (1 DH, 7 SG, 1 GS)
 41 podiums (14 DH, 21 SG, 6 GS)

World Championship results

Olympic results

^ injured during downhill training run

Other honours

Alpine Skiing Junior World championships
2009 Alpine Skiing Junior World Championships in Garmisch-Partenkirchen (Germany)
 Giant slalom
2007 Alpine Skiing Junior World Championships in Altenmarkt (Austria)
 Downhill
 Super-G
 Giant slalom
2006 Alpine Skiing Junior World Championships in Mont Sainte-Anne (Canada)
 Giant slalom

Swiss Alpine Skiing championships
2005 Swiss Alpine Skiing Championships in Veysonnaz (Switzerland)
 Giant slalom
2006 Swiss Alpine Skiing Championships in St. Moritz (Switzerland)
 Giant slalom
2009 Swiss Alpine Skiing Championships in St. Moritz (Switzerland)
 Giant slalom

German Alpine Skiing championships
2009 German Alpine Skiing Championships in Oberjoch (Germany)
 Giant slalom

Liechtenstein Alpine Skiing championships
2006 Liechtenstein Alpine Skiing Championships in Malbun (Liechtenstein)
 Giant slalom

See also
List of FIS Alpine Ski World Cup women's race winners
List of Olympic medalist families

References

External links
 '
 Atomic Skis – athletes – Tina Weirather
  – 

1989 births
Liechtenstein female alpine skiers
Liechtenstein people of Austrian descent
Alpine skiers at the 2006 Winter Olympics
Alpine skiers at the 2018 Winter Olympics
Olympic alpine skiers of Liechtenstein
Medalists at the 2018 Winter Olympics
Olympic medalists in alpine skiing
Olympic bronze medalists for Liechtenstein
People from Vaduz
Living people
People from Gamprin